Apples appear in many religious traditions, often as a mystical or forbidden fruit. One of the problems identifying apples in religion, mythology and folktales is that as late as the 17th century, the word "apple" was used as a generic term for all (foreign) fruit other than berries, but including nuts. This term may even have extended to plant galls, as they were thought to be of plant origin (see oak apple).  For instance, when tomatoes were introduced into Europe, they were called "love apples".  In one Old English work, cucumbers are called eorþæppla (lit. "earth-apples'), just as in French, Dutch, Hebrew, Afrikaans, Persian  and Swiss German as well as several other German dialects, the words for potatoes mean "earth-apples".  In some languages, oranges are called "golden apples" or "Chinese apples". Datura is called "thorn-apple".

Ethnobotanical and ethnomycological scholars such as R. Gordon Wasson, Carl Ruck and Clark Heinrich write that the mythological apple is a symbolic substitution for the entheogenic Amanita muscaria (or fly agaric) mushroom.  Its association with knowledge is an allusion to the revelatory states described by some shamans and users of psychedelic mushrooms. At times artists would co-opt the apple, as well as other religious symbology, whether for ironic effect or as a stock element of symbolic vocabulary. Thus, secular art as well made use of the apple as symbol of love and sexuality. It is often an attribute associated with Venus who is shown holding it.

Mythology and religion

Though the forbidden fruit in the Book of Genesis is not identified, popular Christian tradition holds that Adam and Eve ate an apple from the forbidden tree in the Garden of Eden. The unnamed fruit of Eden thus became an apple under the influence of the story of the golden apples in the Garden of Hesperides. As a result, the apple became a symbol for knowledge, immortality, temptation, the fall of man and sin. According to the Bible, there is nothing to show the forbidden fruit of the tree of knowledge was necessarily an apple. 

The classical Greek word μῆλον (mēlon), or dialectal μᾶλον (mālon), now a loanword in English as melon, meant tree fruit in general, but was borrowed into Latin as mālum, meaning 'apple'. The similarity of this word to Latin mălum, meaning 'evil', may also have influenced the apple's becoming interpreted as the biblical "forbidden fruit" in the commonly used Latin translation called Vulgate.  

The larynx in the human throat has been called Adam's apple because of the folk tale that the bulge was caused by the forbidden fruit sticking in the throat of Adam.  The apple as symbol of sexual seduction has sometimes been used to imply sexuality between men, possibly in an ironic vein.

The notion of the apple as a symbol of sin is reflected in artistic renderings of the fall from Eden. When held in Adam's hand, the apple symbolises sin.  But, when Christ is portrayed holding an apple, he represents the Second Adam who brings life.  This difference reflects the evolution of the symbol in Christianity. In the Old Testament, the apple was significant of the fall of man; in the New Testament, it is an emblem of the redemption from that fall.  The apple is represented in pictures of the Madonna and Infant Jesus as another sign of that redemption.

In some versions (such as Young's Literal Translation) of the Bible, the Hebrew word for mandrakes dudaim (Genesis 30:14) is translated as "love apples" (not to be confused with the New World tomatoes).  There are several instances in the Old Testament where the apple is used in a more favourable light.  The phrase 'the apple of your eye' comes from verses in Deuteronomy 32:10, Psalm 17:8 Proverbs 7:2, and Zechariah 2:8, implying an object or person who is greatly valued.  In Proverbs 25:11, the verse states, "a word fitly spoken is like apples of gold in settings of silver".  In the love songs of the Song of Solomon, the apple is used in a sensual context.  In these latter instances, the apple is used as a symbol for beauty.  The apple appears again in Joel 1:12 in a verse with a sense of profound loss when the apple tree withers.
During the Jewish New Year - Rosh Hashanah - it is customary to eat apples dipped in honey to evoke a "new year that is good [the apple] and sweet [the honey]".

Greek

The Garden of the Hesperides is Hera's orchard in the west, where either a single apple plant or a grove grows, producing golden apples. According to legend, when the marriage of Zeus and Hera took place, the different deities came with nuptial presents for the latter, and among them Gaia, with branches bearing golden apples upon them as a wedding gift. The Hesperides were given the task of tending to the grove, but occasionally picked apples from it themselves. Not trusting them, Hera also placed in the garden an immortal, never-sleeping, hundred-headed dragon named Ladon as an additional safeguard.

In the myth of the Judgement of Paris, it was from the Garden that Eris, the goddess of discord, obtained the Apple of Discord. Eris became disgruntled after she was excluded from the wedding of Peleus and Thetis. In retaliation, she tossed a golden apple inscribed Kallisti ('For the most beautiful one'), into the wedding party. Three goddesses claimed the apple: Hera, Athena, and Aphrodite. Paris of Troy was appointed to select the recipient. After being bribed by both Hera and Athena, Aphrodite tempted him with the most beautiful woman in the world, Helen of Sparta. He awarded the apple to Aphrodite, thus indirectly causing the Trojan War.

The Greek hero Heracles, as a part of his Twelve Labours, was required to travel to the Garden of the Hesperides and pick the golden apples off the Tree of Life growing at its center.

Atalanta, also of Greek mythology, raced all her suitors in an attempt to avoid marriage. She outran all but Hippomenes (a.k.a. Melanion, a name possibly derived from melon the Greek word for both "apple" and fruit in general), who defeated her by cunning, not speed. Hippomenes knew that he could not win in a fair race, so he used three golden apples (gifts of Aphrodite, the goddess of love) to distract Atalanta. It took all three apples and all of his speed, but Hippomenes was finally successful, winning the race and Atalanta's hand.

Norse
In Norse mythology, Iðunn, the goddess of eternal youth, is the keeper of an eski (a wooden box made of ash wood and often used for carrying personal possessions) full of apples eaten by the gods when they begin to grow old, rendering them young again. This is described as recurring until Ragnarök. Gangleri (described as King Gylfi in disguise) states that it seems to him that the gods depend greatly upon Iðunn's good faith and care. Iðunn was once abducted by Þjazi the giant, who used Loki to lure Iðunn and her apples out of Ásgarðr. After borrowing Freyja's falcon skin, Loki liberated Iðunn from Þjazi by transforming her into a nut for the flight back. Þjazi gave chase in the form of an eagle, whereupon reaching Ásgarðr he was set aflame by a bonfire lit by the Æsir.

English scholar Hilda Ellis Davidson notes a connection between apples and the Vanir, a group of gods associated with fertility in Norse mythology, citing an instance of eleven "golden apples" being given to woo the beautiful Gerðr by Skírnir, who was acting as messenger for the major Vanir god Freyr in stanzas 19 and 20 of the poem Skírnismál. Davidson also notes a further connection between fertility and apples in Norse mythology; in chapter 2 of the Völsunga saga when the major goddess Frigg sends King Rerir an apple after he prays to Odin for a child, Frigg's messenger (in the guise of a crow) drops the apple in his lap as he sits atop a mound.

The Norse kenning apples of Hel (epli Heljar) occurs in a piece by the skald Þórbjörn Brúnason embedded in the Heiðarvíga saga. The phrase appears to refer to death itself as a subversion of Iðunn's apples. The skald says that his wife desires his death, and that she wants him to live under the earth and to give apples of Hel to him. Davidson believes this may specifically imply that the apple was thought of by the skald as the food of the dead.

Celtic
The pome fruit and tree of the apple is celebrated in numerous functions in Celtic mythology, legend, and folklore; it is an emblem of fruitfulness and sometimes a means to immortality. Wands of druids were made from wood either of the yew or of the apple.

Allantide (meaning first day of winter) is a Cornish festival that was traditionally celebrated on the night of 31 October, as well as the following day time. One of the most important parts of this festival was the giving of Allan apples, large glossy red apples that were highly polished, to family and friends as tokens of good luck. Allan apple markets used to be held throughout West Cornwall in the run up to the feast. and in the town of St Just it surpassed Christmas as a time for giving gifts until the late 20th century. A game was also recorded in which two pieces of wood were nailed together in the shape of a cross. It was then suspended, with 4 lit candles on each arm and Allan apples suspended underneath. The aim being to catch the apples with your mouth without getting molten wax on your face. For unmarried recipients the apples would be placed under their pillows in the hope that they would bring dreams of their future wife or husband.

The acquisition of the Silver Branch in The Voyage of Bran, a silver apple branch with white blossoms, is the incident which sends the eponymous hero Bran mac Febail on a journey to the Otherworld.

A magical silver branch with three golden apples belonged to the sea deity Manannán mac Lir and was given to the high king Cormac mac Airt in the narrative of the Echtra Cormaic. The branch created magical soporific music that assuaged those afflicted with injury or illness to sleep. In the Irish tale Echtra Condla, Conle the son of Conn is fed an apple by a fairy lover, which sustains him in terms of food and drink for a month without diminishing; but it also makes him long for the woman and the beautiful country of women to which his lover is enticing him.

In the Arthurian mythos, the island of Avalon is considered the Isle of Apples, and its very name, originally Welsh, refers to the fruit. Geoffrey of Monmouth's Vita Merlini describes the enchanted isle as being populated by many apple trees. Avalon from its first inception was considered the home of the magical Morgan le Fay, her sisters, and their mystical practices.

After being killed by brigands, the Breton pseudo-saint Konorin was transformed into a mysterious apple which, when eaten by a young virgin, causes her impregnation and his rebirth as the "son of the apple, the fruit of wisdom".

Legends, folklore, and traditions

 In North America a Native American is called an "apple" (a slur that stands for someone who is "red on the outside, white on the inside.") primarily by other Native Americans to indicate someone who has lost touch with their cultural identity. First used in the 1980s.
 Savior of the Apple Feast Day is celebrated on August 19 in Russia and Ukraine. 
 A boatbuilder's superstition holds that it is unlucky to build a boat out of wood from an apple tree because this wood was previously used to manufacture coffins.
 Since 1990, Apple Day has been held across the UK and beyond, on October 21. This is a festival created by charity Common Ground to support localism: folksongs, biodiversity, buried orchards, children's games.
 Irish and Finnish folklore claims that if an apple is peeled into one continuous ribbon and thrown behind a woman's shoulder, it will land in the shape of the future husband's initials.
 A popular folk art involves a process to turn apples into wrinkly representations of human heads, usually be placed on dolls.  In 1975, Vincent Price promoted a horror-themed kit that used a similar process to create faux shrunken heads, Shrunken Head Apple Sculpture, by Whiting Crafts.
 In some places, apple bobbing is a traditional Halloween activity.
 During the Jewish New Year - [Rosh Hashanah] - it is customary to eat apples dipped in honey to evoke a "sweet new year".
 In the United States, Denmark, Finland and Sweden, a fresh, polished apple was a traditional children's gift for a teacher, starting in the 19th century. The symbol of an apple is still strongly associated with teachers to this day, with apples being a popular theme for gifts and awards given to exemplary teachers.
 The Apple Wassail is a traditional form of wassailing practiced in cider orchards of South West England during the winter. The ceremony is said to 'bless' the apple trees to produce a good crop in the forthcoming season.
 "Comparing apples and oranges" means to examine the similarities of things that are completely different; in German and Dutch the corresponding expression is "comparing apples with pears".
 "An apple a day keeps the doctor away" is a popular saying, the apple obviously symbolizing health, but also the advantages of eating fresh fruit.
 Johnny Appleseed is said to have wandered the early United States planting apple trees by leaving seeds wherever he went.
 The design concept for the Design and Arts Arcadia of Myungseung, located in Chuncheon, Korea, is based on an apple with the top-third and the bottom-third sliced off while having the skin peeled around the circumference.'
 In Kazakhstan, the ex-capital city's name "Almaty" derives from the Kazakh word for 'apple' (алма), and thus is often translated as "full of apples;" alma is also 'apple' in other Turkic languages, as well as in Hungarian.
 When Eris tossed the Golden Apple of Discord into the feast of the gods at the wedding of Peleus and Thetis, at least in historic literary terms, the reference to 'apple' would more likely have been an extinct species of the Balkans similar to the pomegranate.

See also 
 Apple Tree Man
 Shooting an apple off one's child's head
 The symbol in Psychoanalysis and archetypes

References

Apples
Symbolism
Comparative mythology